is a Japanese actor. He is most noted for playing villains and appeared in many jidaigeki and detective television dramas as a guest. After graduating from Meiji University, he signed a contract with Toei Company. He made his film debut with Yarodomo Omotee Dero.

Filmography

Films
 Yarodomo Omotee Dero (1956)
 Taking The Castle (1965)
Zoku Soshiki Bōryoku (1967)
 Outlaw:Kill! (1968)
 Shinjuku outlaw: Step On the Gas (1970)
 Sympathy for the Underdog (1971)
 Kantō Exile (1971)
 Outlaw Killers: Three Mad Dog Brothers (1972)
 Terrifying Girls' High School: Lynch Law Classroom (1973)
 Girl Boss: Escape From Reform School (1973)
 The Last Samurai (1974)
The Homeless (1974)
 Champion of Death (1975)
 Graveyard of Honor (1975)
 Gambling Den Heist (1975)
 Yakuza Graveyard (1976)
 The Resurrection of the Golden Wolf (1979)
 Peanuts (1996)

Television drama
 Daichūshingura (1971) as Maebara
 Gunbei Meyasubako (1971) as Saito
 Hissatsu Shiokinin (1972) guest star in episode 11
 Taiyō ni Hoero! (1973~1984) guest star in episodes 37, 96, 110, 529, and 599
 Tasukenin Hashiru  (1974) guest star in episode 20
 G-Men '75 (1975) guest star in episode 10
 Nagasaki Hangachōu (1975) guest star in episode 14
 Tsūkai! Kōchiyama Sōshun (1975) guest star in episode 12
 Hissatsu Shiokiya Kagyō (1975) guest star in episode 4
 Daitokai Tatakaino Hibi (1976) guest star in episode 10 and 30
 Shin Hissatsu Shiokinin (1977) guest star in episodes 3, 21, and 31
 Hissatsu Karakurinin Fugakuhiyakkei Koroshitabi (1978) guest star in episode 7
Seibu Keisatsu (1979-82) guest star in episode 2, 17, 67 and 121
 Tantei Monogatari (1980) guest star in episode 6 and 24

References

External links

Japanese male film actors
Male actors from Kanagawa Prefecture
20th-century Japanese male actors
Living people
1932 births